Pulvinaria psidii (guava scale; green shield scale; guava mealy scale), is a species of soft scale insect in the family Coccidae.

References

Further reading

 
 
 
 

Insects described in 1893
Coccidae